Wesley Jonathan Waples is an American actor best known for his starring role as Jamal Grant on the NBC Saturday morning comedy-drama series City Guys (1997-2001), Gary Thorpe in the sitcom What I Like About You (2002-2006), Sweetness in the film Roll Bounce (2005), Noah Cruise in the film Crossover (2006) and Burrell "Stamps" Ballentine on TV Land's The Soul Man (2012-2016).

Career
Jonathan started his early career acting in the early 1990s and has had two main roles in two series; City Guys as Jamal Grant, and What I Like About You opposite Amanda Bynes and Jennie Garth as Holly's best friend, Gary Thorpe. Jonathan landed his first job in a music video for Melissa Manchester. He then started working on 21 Jump Street.

Jonathan has starred, co-starred, or made guest appearances in several movies and television shows including: Sister, Sister, Moesha, Boy Meets World, Smart Guy, Thea, Baywatch, A Different World, Boston Public, Crossover, National Lampoon's Bag Boy, Divine Intervention (2007 film), Roll Bounce, and the 1995 film Panther as Bobby Hutton.

Personal life
Jonathan is married to Tamara Mitchell. They have a daughter, Faye. He was raised as a Jehovah's Witness.

Filmography

Film

Television

References

External links

Wesley Jonathan's Official MySpace Page

Living people
Male actors from Los Angeles
American male child actors
American male film actors
American male television actors
American Jehovah's Witnesses
African-American male actors
21st-century African-American people
20th-century African-American people
Year of birth missing (living people)